Coralie Adèle van den Cruyce (1796–1858), in marriage Coralie de Félix de la Motte, was a Belgian writer, feminist and poet.

She was born into an aristocratic family in Paris on 13 October 1796.
Among her works were the plays Les orphelins de la grande armée (1834) and Les Violettes (1836). In Bas-bleus, she defended the right of women to express themselves as writers against contemporary criticism. She was married to the noble officer Eugene-Francois-Auguste Pompée de Félix de la Motte and a leading member of Brussels aristocratic life. She died at Geel on 27 June 1858.

References

1796 births
1858 deaths
Belgian women poets
19th-century Belgian women writers
19th-century Belgian writers
Belgian feminists
Belgian nobility
19th-century Belgian poets
19th-century Belgian dramatists and playwrights
Belgian women dramatists and playwrights